Netball New South Wales Waratahs is an Australian netball team that represents Netball New South Wales in the Australian Netball League. In 2008 they were founder members of the ANL. They were ANL champions in 2011 and have been grand finalists on a further five occasions, making them the second most successful team in the ANL after Victorian Fury. Waratahs are effectively the reserve team of New South Wales Swifts.

History

Netball New South Wales
Waratahs are one of two teams that represent Netball New South Wales in senior or national leagues. Their senior team, New South Wales Swifts, have represented Netball New South Wales in both the ANZ Championship and Suncorp Super Netball.  
Netball New South Wales have also entered a second team, NNSW Blues in the Australian Netball League.

ANL champions
In 2011 Waratahs became the first team other than Victorian Fury to win the  Australian Netball League title. In the grand final they defeated Fury 55–46. The winning Waratahs team was coached by Robert Wright and captained by Carla Dziwoki. Other members of the successful squad included Samantha May, Jessica Mansell, April Letton, Ashleigh Brazill, Paige Hadley, Verity Simmons, Amorette Wild and Tiffany Lincoln.

ANL Grand finals

Home venue
Waratahs play their home games at Netball Central, also known as the Genea Netball Centre, and Quaycentre.

Notable players

Internationals

 Carla Dziwoki
 Samantha Poolman
 Amorette Wild

 Hayley Mulheron

New South Wales Swifts

Giants Netball

ANL MVP
The following Waratahs players were named MVP in the Australian Netball League.

Head coaches

Premierships
Australian Netball League
Winners: 2011: 1
Runners up: 2010, 2012, 2013, 2016, 2019: 5

References

 
Waratahs
Australian Netball League teams
Netball teams in Sydney
Netball
Sports clubs established in 2008
2008 establishments in Australia
Netball teams in Australia